The viola caiçara is a guitar-like plucked stringed instrument from Brazil. It has between 5 and 8 strings, with one string being a short string which goes to a peg at the body-neck join or half-way on the neck, like a banjo. It is otherwise built much like a viola caipira, with the strings attached to a fixed bridge on the soundboard, then going over a small floating bridge. It usually has wooden pegs for tuning.

References

Acoustic guitars
Guitar family instruments
Brazilian musical instruments